Colin McHugo (born 4 December 1945) is a British former professional tennis player.

McHugo, raised in London, was a Surrey county representative and made several appearance at Wimbledon during the 1960s and 1970s. He reached the mixed doubles fourth round partnering Wendy Hall in 1969.

References

External links
 
 

1945 births
Living people
British male tennis players
English male tennis players
Tennis people from Surrey